The 2001 Miami Hurricanes baseball team represented the University of Miami in the 2001 NCAA Division I baseball season. The team was coached by Jim Morris in his 8th season.

The Hurricanes won the College World Series, defeating the Stanford Cardinal in the championship game.

Roster

Schedule 

! style="" | Regular Season (44–12)
|- valign="top" 

|- align="center" bgcolor="ddffdd"
| January 25 ||  || No. 9 || Mark Light Field || W 9–3 || 1–0
|- align="center" bgcolor="ffdddd"
| January 26 || Florida Atlantic || No. 9 || FAU Baseball Stadium || L 10–11 || 1–1
|- align="center" bgcolor="ddffdd"
| January 27 || Florida Atlantic || No. 9 || Mark Light Field || W 4–2 || 2–1
|- align="center" bgcolor="ddffdd"
| February 3 || at No. 13 Florida || No. 9 || McKethan Stadium || W 14–5 || 3–1
|- align="center" bgcolor="ddffdd"
| February 7 || at  || No. 9 || University Park Stadium || W 4–3 || 4–1
|- align="center" bgcolor="ddffdd"
| February 9 || No. 17 Florida || No. 9 || Mark Light Field || W 10–4 || 5–1
|- align="center" bgcolor="ddffdd"
| February 10 || No. 17 Florida || No. 9 || Mark Light Field || W 8–7 || 6–1
|- align="center" bgcolor="ffdddd"
| February 11 || No. 19  || No. 9 || Mark Light Field || L 3–9 || 6–2
|- align="center" bgcolor="ddffdd"
| February 16 ||  || No. 8 || Mark Light Field || W 4–2 || 7–2
|- align="center" bgcolor="ddffdd"
| February 17 || Elon || No. 8 || Mark Light Field || W 10–9 || 8–2
|- align="center" bgcolor="ddffdd"
| February 18 || Elon || No. 8 || Mark Light Field || W 7–4 || 9–2
|- align="center" bgcolor="ffdddd"
| February 21 || Florida International || No. 8 || Mark Light Field || L 10–17 || 9–3
|- align="center" bgcolor="ddffdd"
| February 23 || vs. Florida International || No. 8 || Homestead Sports Complex || W 10–2 || 10–3
|- align="center" bgcolor="ddffdd"
| February 24 || vs. Florida International || No. 8 || Homestead Sports Complex || W 2–0 || 11–3
|- align="center" bgcolor="ddffdd"
| February 25 ||  || No. 8 || Mark Light Field || W 14–0 || 12–3
|-

|- align="center" bgcolor="ddffdd"
| March 2 ||  || No. 8 || Hubert H. Humphrey Metrodome || W 8–6 || 13–3
|- align="center" bgcolor="ddffdd"
| March 3 ||  || No. 8 || Hubert H. Humphrey Metrodome || W 10–1 || 14–3
|- align="center" bgcolor="ddffdd"
| March 4 || No. 21  || No. 8 || Hubert H. Humphrey Metrodome || W 8–2 || 15–3
|- align="center" bgcolor="ddffdd"
| March 7 ||  || No. 7 || Mark Light Field || W 6–2 || 16–3
|- align="center" bgcolor="ffdddd"
| March 9 || No. 30  || No. 7 || Mark Light Field || L 4–6 || 16–4
|- align="center" bgcolor="ddffdd"
| March 10 || No. 30 Rutgers || No. 7 || Mark Light Field || W 13–2 || 17–4
|- align="center" bgcolor="ffdddd"
| March 11 || No. 30 Rutgers || No. 7 || Mark Light Field || L 6–9 || 17–5
|- align="center" bgcolor="ddffdd"
| March 13 || at  || No. 9 || Red McEwen Field || W 8–2 || 18–5
|- align="center" bgcolor="ddffdd"
| March 14 || at South Florida || No. 9 || Red McEwen Field || W 13–9 || 19–5
|- align="center" bgcolor="ddffdd"
| March 16 || No. 19  || No. 9 || Mark Light Field || W 14–13 || 20–5
|- align="center" bgcolor="ffdddd"
| March 17 || No. 19 East Carolina || No. 9 || Mark Light Field || L 2–7 || 20–6
|- align="center" bgcolor="ddffdd"
| March 18 || No. 19 East Carolina || No. 9 || Mark Light Field || W 8–4 || 21–6
|- align="center" bgcolor="ddffdd"
| March 21 ||  || No. 6 || Mark Light Field || W 2–1 || 22–6
|- align="center" bgcolor="ddffdd"
| March 23 ||  || No. 6 || Mark Light Field || W 5–3 || 23–6
|- align="center" bgcolor="ddffdd"
| March 24 || Northeastern || No. 6 || Mark Light Field || W 5–2 || 24–6
|- align="center" bgcolor="ddffdd"
| March 25 || Northeastern || No. 6 || Mark Light Field || W 5–3 || 25–6
|- align="center" bgcolor="ffdddd"
| March 30 || No. 29  || No. 5 || Mark Light Field || L 2–8 || 25–7
|- align="center" bgcolor="ffdddd"
| March 31 || No. 29 Cal State Fullerton || No. 5 || Mark Light Field || L 5–8 || 25–8
|-

|- align="center" bgcolor="ffdddd"
| April 1 || No. 29 Cal State Fullerton || No. 5 || Mark Light Field || L 2–9 || 25–9
|- align="center" bgcolor="ddffdd"
| April 6 ||  || No. 16 || Mark Light Field || W 13–4 || 26–9
|- align="center" bgcolor="ddffdd"
| April 7 || Savannah State || No. 16 || Mark Light Field || W 7–2 || 27–9
|- align="center" bgcolor="ddffdd"
| April 8 || Savannah State || No. 16 || Mark Light Field || W 16–5 || 28–9
|- align="center" bgcolor="ffdddd"
| April 13 || No. 3  || No. 11 || Mark Light Field || L 9–10 || 28–10
|- align="center" bgcolor="ddffdd"
| April 14 || No. 3 Florida State || No. 11 || Mark Light Field || W 5–4 || 29–10
|- align="center" bgcolor="ddffdd"
| April 15 || No. 3 Florida State || No. 11 || Mark Light Field || W 7–5 || 30–10
|- align="center" bgcolor="ddffdd"
| April 20 || at No. 9 Florida State || No. 7 || Mike Martin Field at Dick Howser Stadium || W 7–5 || 31–10
|- align="center" bgcolor="ddffdd"
| April 21 || at No. 9 Florida State || No. 7 || Mike Martin Field at Dick Howser Stadium || W 9–6 || 32–10
|- align="center" bgcolor="ddffdd"
| April 22 || at No. 9 Florida State || No. 7 || Mike Martin Field at Dick Howser Stadium || W 7–4 || 33–10
|- align="center" bgcolor="ffdddd"
| April 27 ||  || No. 7 || Mark Light Field || L 0–5 || 34–11
|- align="center" bgcolor="ddffdd"
| April 28 || Virginia || No. 7 || Mark Light Field || W 5–1 || 35–11
|- align="center" bgcolor="ddffdd"
| April 29 || Virginia || No. 5 || Mark Light Field || W 12–6 || 36–11
|-

|- align="center" bgcolor="ffdddd"
| May 4 ||  || No. 5 || Mark Light Field || L 2–3 || 36–12
|- align="center" bgcolor="ddffdd"
| May 5 || Jacksonville || No. 5 || Mark Light Field || W 13–3 || 37–12
|- align="center" bgcolor="ddffdd"
| May 6 || Jacksonville || No. 5 || Mark Light Field || W 6–2 || 38–12
|- align="center" bgcolor="ddffdd"
| May 11 ||  || No. 4 || Mark Light Field || W 12–4 || 39–12
|- align="center" bgcolor="ddffdd"
| May 12 || Florida Southern || No. 4 || Mark Light Field || W 16–3 || 40–12
|- align="center" bgcolor="ddffdd"
| May 13 || Florida Southern || No. 4 || Mark Light Field || W 5–4 || 41–12
|- align="center" bgcolor="ddffdd"
| May 18 ||  || No. 2 || Mark Light Field || W 17–5 || 42–12
|- align="center" bgcolor="ddffdd"
| May 19 || New York Tech || No. 2 || Mark Light Field || W 14–7 || 43–12
|- align="center" bgcolor="ddffdd"
| May 20 || New York Tech || No. 2 || Mark Light Field || W 11–1 || 44–12
|-

|-
! style="" | Postseason (9–0)
|-

|- align="center" bgcolor="ddffdd"
| May 25 || vs. (4)  || (1) No. 1 || Mark Light Field || W 14–6 || 45–12
|- align="center" bgcolor="ddffdd"
| May 26 || vs. (2) Florida || (1) No. 1 || Mark Light Field || W 6–2 || 46–12
|- align="center" bgcolor="ddffdd"
| May 27 || vs. (3)  || (1) No. 1 || Mark Light Field || W 16–8 || 47–12
|-

|- align="center" bgcolor="ddffdd"
| June 1 || vs. No. 12 Clemson || (2) No. 1 || Mark Light Field || W 10–8 || 48–12
|- align="center" bgcolor="ddffdd"
| June 2 || vs. No. 12 Clemson || (2) No. 1 || Mark Light Field || W 14–6 || 49–12
|-

|- align="center" bgcolor="ddffdd"
| June 9 || vs. No. 8  || (2) No. 1 || Rosenblatt Stadium || W 21–13 || 50–12
|- align="center" bgcolor="ddffdd"
| June 11 || vs. (3) No. 2 Southern California || (2) No. 1 || Rosenblatt Stadium || W 4–3 || 51–12
|- align="center" bgcolor="ddffdd"
| June 14 || vs. No. 8 Tennessee || (2) No. 1 || Rosenblatt Stadium || W 12–6 || 52–12
|- align="center" bgcolor="ddffdd"
| June 16 || vs. (4) No. 4 Stanford || (2) No. 1 || Rosenblatt Stadium || W 12–1 || 53–12
|-

Awards and honors 
Javy Rodriguez
 Team Most Valuable Player
 All-American
 NCAA Stolen Base Leader

Kevin Brown
 College World Series All-Tournament Team

Tom Farmer
 College World Series All-Tournament Team

George Huguet
 Freshman All-America

Charlton Jimerson
 College World Series Most Outstanding Player

Danny Matienzo
 College World Series All-Tournament Team

Hurricanes in the 2001 MLB Draft 
The following members of the Miami baseball program were drafted in the 2001 Major League Baseball Draft.

References 

Miami Hurricanes
Miami Hurricanes baseball seasons
College World Series seasons
NCAA Division I Baseball Championship seasons
Miami Hurricanes baseball team
Miami